Leyla Bolatkyzy Mahat (Leily Bolatqyzy Mahat) is an artist, curator, gallery director and an associate professor of the Faculty of Painting and Sculpture at Kazakh National University of Arts. Doctor of Philosophy of fine arts. The Chairperson of Curatorial board of Contemporary Art Center «Kulanshi». President of the Eurasian Academy of Arts.

Awards 

State Award «20 years of Independence» for contribution to the art, Nur-Sultan, Kazakhstan
Franz Kafka Medal for contribution to art, Czech Republic.
Diploma of Asia-Pacific Association of Artists, Tokyo, Japan
Interparliamentary Assembly of the Commonwealth of Independent States award for contribution to art, St. Petersburg 
Honored Member of the Academy of Art, Prague, Czech Republic
Laureate of the European Art Union
Merit Award «Golden Europea» and «European platter», Prague, Czech Republic

Dr.Leyla Mahat is an author and curator of Kazakh and international projects. The artist's exhibitions were held at museums and galleries in Kazakhstan, Russia, United States of America, Italy, Czech Republic, Slovakia, Japan, China, Bangladesh, India, Netherlands, Austria, Germany, Moldova, Turkey, Slovenia, Latvia and Romania.

Paintings in public collections of 

State Museum of Arts n.a A.Kasteyev, Almaty, Kazakhstan
National museum of Republic of Kazakhstan, Nur-Sultan
Museum of the First President of Republic of Kazakhstan, Nur-Sultan, Kazakhstan
Museum of Fine Arts of the Ministry of Culture, Ankara, Turkey
Historical Municipal Museum Uldingen, Germany
State Museum of Fine Arts, Chisinau, Moldova
«Art 21» Gallery, Munich, Germany
«Saray» Gallery, Berlin, Germany
«Five+Art» Gallery, Vienna, Austria
Foundation's collection of Kisho Kurokawa, Tokyo, Japan
Gallery of Tokyo University of Arts
Contemporary Center Guangzhou, China
and in Private Collections in: Kazakhstan, USA, Turkey, Germany, Russia, Great Britain, Belgium, India, Austria, Japan, Czech Republic and other countries.

Projects 

«ART FORUM KULANSHI», Nur-Sultan, Kazakhstan, 2006-2012
«KünsteWoche» Festival Jesteburg, Germany 2005, 2006
«Internationale Art Festival in Izmir», Türkei, 2004
«Silk Road by Modern Art» – Gallery "Art 21", München, Germany, 2006
«Silk Road by Modern Art» – Art Center Berlin, Berlin, Germany,  2006
«United Buddy Bear» – Germany, the world tour
«Bangladesch Art Biennale», Dhaka, Bangladesch
«ART EXPRESS», Berlin-Budapest, Hungary 2008-2009
«International Art Festival», New Delhi,  India, 2013
«New Silk Roads: Painting Beyond Borders», Singapur, 2015
«Beijing International Biennale», Beijing, China, 2015
«Made in Astana», Nur-Sultan, Kazakhstan, 2016-2018
«Art Circle» International Art Festival, Gorishka Brda, Slovenia, 2017-2019
«Astana Street Art», Nur-Sultan, Kazakhstan, 2018,2019
«Miami Artweeks. Miami 2.0», Artbox project, Miami, USA, 2019

Gallery

Links 

 My Kazakhstan: Profiles of Individual Stories in an Extraordinary Country
 Personal exhibition of Kazakhstan artist Leyla Mahat opened in the capital of Romania
 Expoziția de pictură „Here I am”  Leyla Mahat – 5.11.18 Muzeul de Artă Cluj-Napoca
 Vernisaj HERE I AM
 Eurasian Academy of Arts – An international organisation for research and support in the field of culture and art
 Exhibition of the Kazakh artist Leyla Mahat opened at the palace of peace and harmony
 Finissage: Here I Am Leyla Mahat
 AIFC ART WEEK
 Leyla Mahat – „Here I Am”: A Steppe Flower
 Private Viewing: Leyla Mahat
 Kazakh art in Bucharest: HERE I Am – Leyla Mahat
 In the Romanian city Cluj-Napoca an exhibition of paintings by Kazakh artist Leyla Makhat is taking place
 Ceremonial opening in Astana
 PAINTING AND SCULPTURE
 Leyla Mahat - Saatchi art
 Female Artists Showcased at Nazarbayev Centre
 YouTube: Kulanshi Contemporary art center

References

Kazakhstani sculptors
Kazakhstani women sculptors
Kazakhstani painters
Kazakhstani women painters
Contemporary artists
Year of birth missing (living people)
Living people